Hymns is the fifth solo studio album and first Gospel album by American country music singer-songwriter Loretta Lynn. It was released on November 15, 1965, by Decca Records.

The album consists of 12 gospel and inspirational songs that were either popular over the years or were written by Lynn for this album. Well known Christian songs such as "How Great Thou Art" and "In the Sweet By and By" appear on the album.

Critical reception

In the issue dated November 27, 1965, Billboard published a review of the album, saying that "Loretta Lynn proves once again that whatever she does, she does to perfection and that's exactly what this glorious program of heartfelt performances contains. "Where No One Stands Alone" and "Peace in the Valley" are two exceptional examples of the feel and tenderness she has for this all too important music. Destined for a high spot on the LP chart.

Commercial performance 
The album debuted at No. 16 on the US Billboard Hot Country Albums chart dated January 22, 1966. It peaked at No. 10 on the chart dated February 12. The album spent a total of 17 weeks on the chart.

The album's only single, "Everybody Want to Go to Heaven", was released in November 1965 and did not chart.

Recording
Recording of the album took place on June 3, 7 and 8, 1965, at RCA Victor Studio in Nashville, Tennessee.

Track listing

Personnel
Adapted from the album liner notes and Decca recording session records.
Mae Boren Axton – liner notes
Harold Bradley – guitar
Owen Bradley – producer
Floyd Cramer – piano
Buddy Harman – drums
Don Helms – steel guitar
Junior Huskey – bass
Loretta Lynn – lead vocals
Grady Martin – guitar
Wayne Moss – guitar

Charts

References 

Loretta Lynn albums
1965 albums
Albums produced by Owen Bradley
Decca Records albums
Gospel albums by American artists
King Records (United States) albums